"Tempus Fugue-it" (also known as "Tempus Fugit") is a 1949 jazz composition by jazz pianist Bud Powell (1924–1966). It has been recorded by Powell, Miles Davis and many others.

The song is not actually a fugue in compositional form; its title is a pun on the Latin phrase tempus fugit, meaning "time flies". The name is also a reflection of the speed at which the piece is played.

References

Citations

Sources
"Tempus Fugit" at Allmusic.com 
"Tempus Fugit," BMI Work #1470248 link

1949 songs
Compositions by Bud Powell